Asaphodes abrogata is a moth in the family Geometridae. It is endemic to New Zealand and can be found from the central North Island as well as the South Island. This species is inhabits open country at altitudes of between 2000 and 4000 ft. Larvae have been reared on Plantago species including Plantago coronopus. It has been recommended that Plantago raoulii be planted to attracted this species. Adults are on the wing in February and  March.

Taxonomy
This species was first described by Francis Walker in 1862 and named Aspilates abrogata, using a specimen collected by P. Earl in Waikouaiti. In 1883 Edward Meyrick placed this species in the Thyone genus and synonymised Fidonia servularia with this species. He discussed this placement and the species in 1884. In 1885 Meyrick replaced the genus name Thyone with Asaphodes. He explained in 1886 that when naming several new genera he had used names that had already been employed and that he had to correct this error. As such he renamed the genus Thyone with the name Asaphodes. In 1898 George Hudson discussed and illustrated this species under the name Asaphodes abrogata. Hudson did the same again in his 1928 publication The butterflies and moths of New Zealand. In 1971 J. S. Dugdale confirmed the placement of this species in the genus Asaphodes. In 1988 Dugdale confirmed this placement in his catalogue of New Zealand Lepidoptera. The holotype of this species is held at the Natural History Museum, London.

Description 

Walker described the species as follows:
The distinctiveness of the brown markings of this species is variable and there is sometimes a transverse line near the base of the forewings.

Distribution
This species is endemic to New Zealand and can be found in the central North Island as well as the South Island.

Behaviour 
The adults of this species are on the wing in February and March. Adults are attracted to light.

Habitat and hosts

This species is inhabits open country at altitudes of between 2000 and 4000 ft. Larvae have been reared on Plantago species including Plantago coronopus. It has been recommended to plant the endemic species Plantago raoulii to attract this species of moth.

References

Moths described in 1862
Moths of New Zealand
Larentiinae
Endemic fauna of New Zealand
Waikouaiti
Taxa named by Francis Walker (entomologist)
Endemic moths of New Zealand